The Critics' Choice Television Award for Best Animated Series is one of the award categories presented annually by the Critics' Choice Television Awards (BTJA). It was introduced in 2012. The winners are selected by a group of television critics that are part of the Broadcast Television Critics Association.

Winners and nominees

2010s

2020s
In 2021, the award was added to the Critics' Choice Super Awards, but was re-added to the Critics' Choice Awards the following year.

Multiple wins
5 wins
 BoJack Horseman (2 consecutive, 3 consecutive)

4 wins
 Archer (consecutive)

Multiple nominations
9 nominations
 Bob's Burgers

8 nominations
 Archer
 The Simpsons

6 nominations
 BoJack Horseman

4 nominations
 Adventure Time
 South Park

3 nominations
 Big Mouth

2 nominations
 Bluey
 Family Guy
 Harley Quinn
 Phineas and Ferb
 Rick and Morty
 Star Trek: Lower Decks
 Star Wars: The Clone Wars
 Star Wars Rebels
 Undone

See also
 Annie Award for Best Animated Television Production
 Primetime Emmy Award for Outstanding Animated Program

References

Critics' Choice Television Awards